Mosel station is a station on the Dresden–Werdau railway and the former 750 mm gauge Mosel–Ortmannsdorf railway in the village of Mosel, part of Zwickau in the German state of Saxony.

History

The station was opened in 1858 with the Chemnitz–Glauchau–Zwickau section of the Dresden–Werdau railway. It was originally classified as a Haltepunkt (halt) and was reclassified as a station in 1875. With the construction of the narrow-gauge Mosel–Ortmannsdorf railway, which was opened in 1885, Mosel became an interchange station. The facilities were extensively expanded for this purpose. In addition to an enlargement of the entrance building, a roundhouse where locomotives were heated (Heizhaus), a new freight shed and other buildings were built. Since 1893, the Zwickau–Crossen–Mosel railway, a freight-only line, has entered the station.

There was a gated level crossing at the station until 1900. Then an underpass was built because of the great increase in traffic on the Dresden–Werdau railway; this still exists today.

In 1951, the narrow-gauge railway was dismantled, but the buildings of the narrow-gauge line remained for some time. The coal-loading facility, for example, was demolished only in 1982. Since 1991, the industrial railway, which now only connects to a drive shaft factory and a Volkswagen works, has been integrated into the eastern part of the station since the 1980s. The remaining part of the industrial railway was converted into a shunting track on 30 April 1999.

References

External links 

 

Railway stations in Saxony
Railway stations in Germany opened in 1858
Buildings and structures in Zwickau (district)